National 1798 Rebellion Centre is a heritage centre dedicated to the history of the 1798 Rebellion located in Enniscorthy, County Wexford.

Establishment
The Centre is housed within a redeveloped Christian Brothers'school. It is funded from the Operational Programme for Tourism, private donations and local fund-raising.

Exhibitions
Upon arrival the visitor crosses 'The Bridge of Democracy' outside the building. The exhibitions cover a number of themes: pre-Revolutionary Europe, the spread of revolution, the Irish context, the United Irishmen, the chain of battles in May and June 1798, Vinegar Hill, and the aftermath of the rebellion. The exhibitions include dioramas and interactive displays. The Centre closed for a period, reopening in 2013, to facilitate a refurbishment of displays.

It forms part of the 32 historical sites which form the Wexford Heritage Trail. The Centre is leading a three-year programme to investigate the battlefield on Vinegar Hill, to identify the extent of the battlefield, locations of fighting, temporary structures, weapons, other artefacts, and the location of possible mass graves.

References

External links
Discover Ireland

Buildings and structures in County Wexford
History of County Wexford
Local museums in the Republic of Ireland